Cambridge Park may refer to:

Australia
Cambridge Park, New South Wales, a suburb of Sydney
Cambridge Park High School, Sydney
Cambridge Park RLFC, a rugby league club

United Kingdom and Channel Islands
Cambridge Science Park, science park at Trinity College, Cambridge
Cambridge Business Park, Cambridge
Cambridge Park, Twickenham, a residential neighbourhood of St Margarets, Twickenham, London
Cambridge Park (Saint Peter Port), a park in Saint Peter Port, Guernsey

United States
Cambridge Junction Historic State Park, a state park in Cambridge Township, Michigan
Cambridge, Evesham, New Jersey, an unincorporated community which is also known as Cambridge Park